La donna del giorno (lit. The Woman of the Day, released in the US as The Doll That Took the Town) is a 1956 Italian drama film starring Virna Lisi, Haya Harareet and Franco Fabrizi.

It is directed by Francesco Maselli and tells the story of a  struggling model who concocts a story of being raped and beaten by three strangers and soon becomes a media darling. Complications arise when the police eventually arrest three suspects.

Cast 

 Virna Lisi: Liliana
 Antonio Cifariello: Giorgio Salustri
 Haya Harareet: Anna
 Serge Reggiani: Mario Grimaldi
 Elisa Cegani: Miss Attenni
 Franco Fabrizi: Aldo
 Vittorio Sanipoli: Police commissioner 
 Mario Carotenuto: Director
 Giuliano Montaldo: Journalist
 Peter Van Wood: Himself

External links 
 

1956 films
1950s Italian-language films
Films directed by Francesco Maselli
Italian drama films
1956 drama films
Films with screenplays by Cesare Zavattini
1950s Italian films
Italian black-and-white films